Private Nicholas Fox (November 1844 to October 2, 1929) was an American soldier who fought in the American Civil War. Fox received the country's highest award for bravery during combat, the Medal of Honor, for his action during the Siege of Port Hudson in Louisiana on 14 June 1863. He was honored with the award on 1 April 1898.

Biography
Fox was born in Oldcastle, County Meath, Ireland in November 1844. While the exact date of his birth is uncertain, he was baptized on November 5, 1844, in the Roman Catholic church in Oldcastle. In 1855, the family emigrated to the United States on the ship Rappahannock, arriving in New York City on 23 May 1855. By the time of the 1860 United States census, they had settled in Greenwich, Connecticut. He enlisted in the 28th Connecticut Volunteer Infantry. By 1890, he and his wife, Catherine Simcox, had settled in Port Chester, New York, where they raised twelve children. Fox worked for the R.B. & W. Bolt Works all his life, eventually becoming a superintendent. He died on 2 October 1929 and his remains are interred at Saint Mary's Cemetery in Rye Brook, New York.

Medal of Honor citation

Citation

See also

List of American Civil War Medal of Honor recipients: A–F

References

1844 births
1929 deaths
People of Connecticut in the American Civil War
Union Army officers
United States Army Medal of Honor recipients
American Civil War recipients of the Medal of Honor
Military personnel from Connecticut